The Port of Cadiz Bay is a port facility in Cadiz Bay serving the city and province of Cádiz in southern Spain. It consists of Cadiz harbour, Cabezuela on the south side of the bay, and Puerto de Santa Maria to the north.

References

External links 
 
 
 
 
 
 
Cadiz Bay 
Buildings and structures in Cádiz
Transport in Spain